The 1997 MTV Europe Music Awards were held at The Ahoy, Rotterdam, Netherlands on 6 November 1997 and were hosted by Ronan Keating. The Prodigy were the big winners of the night winning three awards including Best Video.

Nominations
Winners are in bold text.

Performances
U2 — "Mofo"
Björk — "Bachelorette"
Spice Girls — "Spice Up Your Life"
Skunk Anansie — "Hedonism (Just Because You Feel Good)"
LL Cool J — "Phenomenon"
Blackstreet (featuring Slash) — "Fix"
Jon Bon Jovi — "Janie, Don't Take Your Love To Town"
Aerosmith — "Pink / Falling in Love (Is Hard on the Knees)"
Backstreet Boys — "As Long as You Love Me / Everybody (Backstreet's Back)"
Jovanotti — "L'ombelico del mondo"

Appearances
Dennis Hopper — introduced U2
Alicia Silverstone — presented Best Dance
Backstreet Boys — presented Best Male
Tony Mortimer and Karen Mulder — presented Best Rock
Stephen Dorff and Saffron — presented Best Song
Missy Elliott and David Arquette — presented Best Rap
Louise and Mark Owen — presented Best Female
Peter Andre and Eternal — presented Best Alternative
Dennis Hopper — presented Free Your Mind Award
Caprice Bourret and Steven Tyler — presented Best Group
Nina Persson, Peter Svensson and Katja Schuurman — presented MTV Select
Robbie Williams and Gena Lee Nolin — presented Best New Act
Shola Ama and MC Solaar — presented Best R&B
Prince Naseem and Björk — presented Best Live Act
Hanson — presented Best Video

See also
1997 MTV Video Music Awards

External links
Nominees

1997
1997 music awards
1997 in the Netherlands
November 1997 events in Europe